NSC Nijkerk is a football club from Nijkerk in Gelderland, Netherlands. NSC Nijkerk plays in the 2017–18 Saturday Hoofdklasse B.

References

External links
 Official site

Football clubs in the Netherlands
Football clubs in Nijkerk
Association football clubs established in 1933
1933 establishments in the Netherlands